Mere Sartaj is a 1975 Bollywood film directed by Abdul Rashid Kardar.

Cast
Alka as Sultana 
Nazir Hussain as Parveen's dad 
Jagdeep as Munir-Ul-Haq Qadri 
Trilok Kapoor as Thakur Kaka 
Satish Kaul as Javed Ahmed Gulrez 
Padma Khanna as Shabab Bano 
Roopesh Kumar as Asad 
Nadira as Gulshanbai 
Zaheera as Parveen J. Gulrez
 Helen as Dancer / Singer at Angel Club

Soundtrack
Music composed by Ravi with lyrics by Abdul Malam Mughal .
"Jhooka Jhooka Ke Yeh Nazar  Yoon Uthaai Jaati Hai" - Mohd. Rafi
"Main Hoon Dukhatar-E-Angur  Mast Banaana Rang" - Asha Bhosle
"Mera Sab Kuchh Hai Ae Dilruba Tumhaare Liye" - Asha Bhosle
"Sitamgar Kaafilon Ko Zulm  Dha Kar Loot Lete Hain" - Asha Bhosle

References

External links
 

1975 films
1970s Hindi-language films
Films directed by A. R. Kardar
Films scored by Ravi